Benjamin Dominic Moore (born August 3, 1980) is a Canadian former professional ice hockey centre. He most recently played for the ZSC Lions of the National League (NL), and has played nearly 900 National Hockey League (NHL) games. Initially drafted in the third round, 95th overall, by the New York Rangers in the 2000 NHL Entry Draft, Moore has also played in the NHL for the Pittsburgh Penguins, Minnesota Wild, Toronto Maple Leafs, Buffalo Sabres, Florida Panthers, Montreal Canadiens, Tampa Bay Lightning, San Jose Sharks and Boston Bruins. He is currently an analyst for the NHL on ESPN.

Early life
Moore attended both St. Michael Catholic Elementary School and St. Anthony's Catholic Elementary School in Thornhill, Ontario. As a youth, he played in the 1994 Quebec International Pee-Wee Hockey Tournament with a minor ice hockey team from Don Mills. He then attended high school at St. Michael's College School in Toronto, followed by Harvard University.

Playing career

Amateur
Before his professional career, Moore played for the Thornhill Rattlers and Aurora Tigers of the OJHL. He then joined the Harvard Crimson in the NCAA's ECAC Hockey conference, as did his two brothers, Mark and Steve. In the 1999–2000 season, Dominic joined both older brothers on the Crimson ice hockey team, marking the first brother trio in school history to play at the same time. Moore is currently ranked 11th in all-time scoring at Harvard, also ranking tenth on the school's all-time goal-scoring list. At the 2000 NHL Entry Draft, he was selected in the third round, 95th overall, by the New York Rangers. Continuing his collegiate career, he played for the NCAA First All-American Team (East) in 2002–03.

Professional

New York Rangers
Moore began his professional career in the 2003–04 season, split between the New York Rangers and their minor league affiliate, the Hartford Wolf Pack of the American Hockey League (AHL). He made his NHL debut on November 1, 2003, against the Montreal Canadiens, where he tallied three assists in a 5–1 victory. He became the second player to score three points in his NHL debut with the Rangers, joining George Allen, who did so in 1938. Moore spent the majority of the season with the Wolf Pack. During the 2004–05 NHL lock-out, Moore remained with the Wolf Pack, finishing third on the team in scoring for the year.

Moore rejoined the Rangers at the start of the 2005–06 season, where he was placed on a defensive-minded line with Jed Ortmeyer and Ryan Hollweg. Through minor line-changes throughout the year, Moore continued his solid defensive play and continued to improve.

Pittsburgh Penguins, Minnesota Wild

On July 19, 2006, the Rangers traded Moore to the Pittsburgh Penguins in a three-team trade. During his tenure with the team, he recorded 15 points in 59 games.

On February 27, 2007, the Penguins traded Moore to the Minnesota Wild for a 2007 third-round draft pick. Moore finished the season with 17 points in 69 games.

Toronto Maple Leafs, Buffalo Sabres
On January 11, 2008, the Toronto Maple Leafs claimed Moore off of waivers from the Wild. His debut with the Maple Leafs came on January 12, 2008, against the San Jose Sharks. He was assigned to centre Toronto's top scoring line alongside left winger Jason Blake. On March 4, 2009, Moore was traded by Toronto to the Buffalo Sabres in exchange for a second-round draft pick. At the end of the 2008–09 season, he finished with career-highs in goals (13), assists (32) and points (45) in what remains his highest-scoring season to date.

Florida Panthers, Montreal Canadiens
On October 4, 2009, Moore signed a one-year, $1.1 million contract with the Florida Panthers. Halfway through the season, on February 11, 2010, he was traded to the Montreal Canadiens in exchange for a second-round draft pick in 2011. In the 2010 Stanley Cup playoffs, Moore scored the series-winning goal as the eighth-seeded Canadiens eliminated the Presidents' Trophy-winning Washington Capitals, and scored again in game 7 against the Penguins, though Montreal later lost the Eastern Conference Finals to the Philadelphia Flyers.

Tampa Bay Lightning, departure from hockey
Becoming a free agent following the season, Moore signed with the Tampa Bay Lightning on a two-year, $2.2 million contract. For the second-straight year, Moore reached the Eastern Conference Finals, though his team again was defeated, this time to the eventual Stanley Cup champions, the Boston Bruins.

On February 10, 2012, during the 2011–12 season, Moore was fined $2,500 for an interference infraction that injured the New York Rangers' Ruslan Fedotenko. On February 16, Moore was traded to the San Jose Sharks, along with a seventh-round draft pick, in exchange for a second-round pick. With the trade, it marked Moore's ninth NHL club and the seventh time in his career he has been traded.

Moore played just the first three games of the Sharks in the 2012 playoffs after learning his wife, Katie, had been diagnosed with liver cancer. He sat out the 2012–13 season to tend to Katie, who died in January 2013.

Return to the Rangers
He returned to hockey in the 2013 off-season by signing a one-year contract with the Rangers, the team that first drafted him in 2000.

Moore would be a crucial piece of the Rangers' deep 2014 playoff run, and his perseverance in returning after a tragic loss earned him the Bill Masterton Memorial Trophy. Reaching the Eastern Conference Finals for the third time in his career, Moore finally reached the Stanley Cup Finals after scoring the only goal of Game 6 against the Montreal Canadiens, sending the Rangers to their first Final in 20 years. The Finals, however, would be won in five games by the Los Angeles Kings.

On July 1, 2014, Moore re-signed with the Rangers on a two-year, $3 million contract.

Boston Bruins
After a successful three-year tenure with the Rangers, Moore as a free agent opted to join his 10th NHL club, in agreeing to a one-year contract with the Boston Bruins on August 30, 2016. In his lone season with the club, Moore recorded 25 points in 82 games.

Return to the Maple Leafs
On July 1, 2017, Moore, as a free agent, signed a one-year, $1 million contract to return for a second stint with the Maple Leafs. Early in the season, Moore battled with Eric Fehr for fourth-line centre role in Toronto, effectively winning the spot after the Maple Leafs waived Fehr in late October.

ZSC Lions
As a free agent from the NHL, Moore opted to continue his career abroad, joining Swiss club the ZSC Lions of the National League for the remainder of the season on a one-year contract on January 7, 2019.

Personal life
Moore married Katie Urbanic on July 3, 2010, in Newport, Rhode Island. They bought a house in Cambridge, Massachusetts, in which Katie was very involved in planning and designing. She died on January 7, 2013, after a nine-month battle with liver cancer. Moore created a foundation in her name, The Katie Moore Foundation, to help those with rare forms of cancer. Moore took an 18-month leave to care for Urbanic.

Since 2012, Dominic has hosted Smashfest, a charity ping-pong tournament benefiting The Katie Moore Foundation and The Steve Moore Foundation. 

A year after his wife's death, Dominic started dating Tennessee native Mary Hirst, a fellow Harvard graduate he met through mutual friends. They got engaged four months later and got married in July 2015.

Dominic has two older brothers: Mark and Steve Moore. Both Mark and Steve also played collegiate hockey for the Harvard Crimson, and Steve was also an NHL player who spent three years in the Colorado Avalanche organization after four years at Harvard.

Career statistics

Awards and honours

See also
 Notable families in the NHL

References

External links 
 

1980 births
Living people
Bill Masterton Memorial Trophy winners
Boston Bruins players
Buffalo Sabres players
Canadian ice hockey centres
Florida Panthers players
Hartford Wolf Pack players
Harvard Crimson men's ice hockey players
Sportspeople from Sarnia
Minnesota Wild players
Montreal Canadiens players
New York Rangers draft picks
New York Rangers players
Sportspeople from Markham, Ontario
Ice hockey people from Ontario
Pittsburgh Penguins players
San Jose Sharks players
Tampa Bay Lightning players
People from Thornhill, Ontario
Toronto Maple Leafs players
ZSC Lions players
AHCA Division I men's ice hockey All-Americans